Steve Touchton is an American musician who currently resides in Los Angeles. He was a founding member of the bands XBXRX and Kit. His current projects include the Noise music trio Remainderless and the Experimental music series Ex Im Ot.

References

External links
Bandcamp page
Swaps page at Joyful Noise Recordings
Remainderless page at Oxen Label
Kit page at Upset! the Rhythm
xbxrx
Statewide Sound Masters Unite at UCSD
Dog Star Orchestra concert review

Living people
American rock guitarists
American male guitarists
Musicians from Mobile, Alabama
Guitarists from Alabama
Year of birth missing (living people)